Stephen Harold Henry Clarke is a Welsh archaeologist, he is chairman and founding member of Monmouth Archaeological Society. He was awarded an MBE (civil division) for services to archaeology in the 1997 New Year Honours.

Memberships and awards
 Institute for Archaeologists, member
 Society of Antiquaries of London, fellow
 Congress of Independent Archaeologists, member
 Severn Levels Research, committee member
 Glamorgan - Gwent Archaeological Trust, Committee member
 Monmouth Archaeological Society, chairman and founding member
 Monmouth Field and History Society, chairman
 Monmouthshire Antiquarian Association, committee member
 Chepstow Archaeological Society, president
 Forest of Dean Archaeological Group, life vice-president
 Hereford Archaeological Trust, member

Bibliography

 
 —— (2013). The Lost Lake, Evidence of Prehistoric boat building.  
 —— (2016). The Lost Lake, Revised Edition, 8000 years overlooking the Monmouth Lake.   Clarke Printing

References

Welsh archaeologists
Living people
Date of birth missing (living people)
Year of birth missing (living people)